Saurita rubripuncta is a moth in the subfamily Arctiinae. It was described by Schaus in 1911. It is found in Costa Rica.

References

Natural History Museum Lepidoptera generic names catalog

Moths described in 1911
Saurita